Pat McCoy may refer to:

 Pat McCoy (American football) (born 1980), American football offensive tackle
 Pat McCoy (baseball) (born 1988), American baseball pitcher
 Pat Moran McCoy (born 1934), jazz pianist
 Pat McCoy (footballer), Ulster Footballer of the Year 1985–86